SS Thomas Stone was a Liberty ship built in the United States during World War II. She was named after Thomas Stone, a Founding Father, American planter and lawyer who signed the United States Declaration of Independence as a delegate for Maryland. He later worked on the committee that formed the Articles of Confederation in 1777. He acted as President of Congress for a short time in 1784.

Construction
Thomas Stone was laid down on 20 October 1941, under a Maritime Commission (MARCOM) contract, MCE hull 27, by the Bethlehem-Fairfield Shipyard, Baltimore, Maryland; and was launched on 12 April 1942.

History
Thomas Stone was allocated to American West African Line Inc., on 16 May 1942. On 30 December 1947, she was laid up in the Hudson River Reserve Fleet, Jones Point, New York. On 11 June 1952, she was laid up in the James River Reserve Fleet, Lee Hall, Virginia. On 6 May 1954, Thomas Stone was withdrawn from the fleet to be loaded with grain under the "Grain Program 1954", she returned loaded on 17 May 1954. On 13 August 1956, she was withdrawn to be unload, she returned reloaded with grain 31 August 1956. On 4 May 1963, Thomas Stone was withdrawn from the fleet to be unloaded, she returned empty on 12 May 1963. She was sold for scrapping on 13 April 1971, to Northern Metal Company, for $41,200. She was removed from the fleet, 5 May 1971.

References

Bibliography

 
 
 
 

 

Liberty ships
1942 ships
Ships built in Baltimore
Hudson River Reserve Fleet
James River Reserve Fleet
James River Reserve Fleet Grain Program
Ships named for Founding Fathers of the United States